"When Will I See You Again" is a song released in 1974 by American soul group The Three Degrees from their third album, The Three Degrees. The song was written and produced by Kenny Gamble and Leon Huff. Sheila Ferguson sang the lead, accompanied by Fayette Pinkney and Valerie Holiday. Billboard named the song #67 on their list of 100 Greatest Girl Group Songs of All Time.

Background
Sheila Ferguson recalled that "the song was played to me by Kenny Gamble at the piano in 1973 and I threw a tantrum. I screamed and yelled and said I would never sing it. I thought it was ridiculously insulting to be given such a simple song and that it took no talent to sing it. We did do it and several million copies later, I realized that he knew more than me." She would later have a #60 hit with a solo remake of the track in 1994. The song is unique in that every sentence is a question, heightening the overall effect and emotion. The Three Degrees performed the song at Prince Charles' 30th birthday party at Buckingham Palace in 1978.

Music video
The YouTube music video of this song is blocked in the USA, United Kingdom, and Germany because of Sony Music Entertainment copyright grounds.

The video is on YouTube, Feb. 10, 2023

Chart performance 
It was one of the most successful recordings of the "Philly Soul" era. In the U.S., "When Will I See You Again" peaked at #2 on the pop singles chart, behind "Kung Fu Fighting" by Carl Douglas. The song reached #1 on the adult contemporary chart, and #4 on the R&B chart in the US in the autumn of 1974. In the UK, it fared even better, spending two weeks at the top of the UK Singles Chart in August 1974.

Weekly charts

Year-end charts

Brother Beyond version 

British boy band Brother Beyond covered the song on their 1989 album Trust, that was also released in the Compilation Ronny's Pop Show [1990/1] – Hochfeine Pop-Musik-Schallplatte.

Track listing
CD maxi
 "When Will I See You Again" (Radio Mix) – 4:28	
 "New Heights (The Clompete Mix)" (Cloud 9 Mix) – 4:25	
 "When Will I See You Again (Extended)" (Gee Extended Mix) – 6:42	

7" Single
 When Will I See You Again – 3:35	
 New Heights (Edit) – 3:20

Charts

Thomas Anders version 

In 1993, Thomas Anders released his version of the song with The Three Degrees, which appeared on the same-named album. The success of the cover version was modest. The following year, Anders released a Spanish-language version of the song titled Una mañana de sol.

Track listing
CD maxi
 When Will I See You Again – 3:30	
 Thomas Anders – Is It My Love 3:40	
 When Will I See You Again (Extended Version) – 5:15	
 		 	 
7" Single 	 
 When Will I See You Again (Precious String-House Mix) – 4:45	
 When Will I See You Again (Precious Club Mix) – 5:10	
 When Will I See You Again (Precious Outerspace Mix) – 5:32	
 When Will I See You Again (Precious Pop Mix) – 5:28

Charts

Other cover versions 
 Geoffrey Chung arranged a reggae version released as a 7" on the Antrim label in 1974 with vocals by Marcia Griffiths (A) and Onika (B).
 Magda Layna released the song as a single on Megatone Records in 1983.
 The O'Jays covered the song on their 1983 album, When Will I See You Again.
 Hong Kong Cantopop singer Priscilla Chan (陳慧嫻) released a Cantonese cover version "幾時再見?!" (lit.: "When Will I See You Again?!") on her album, 秋色 (lit. "Autumn Colours"), in 1988.
 Billy Bragg's version is the second song on the NME's 1992 covers compilation Ruby Trax. 
 Japanese Singer CINDY covered the song on her 1997 compilation album Surprise.
 U2 played the song on the Elevation Tour. It was most remembered when the band played it at Slane Castle on 25 August and 1 September 2001.
 Erasure covered the song on their 2002 album Other People's Songs.
 Guitarist Peter White remade the song for his 2016 album Groovin', with Amber DiLena providing vocals.

References

External links
 Lyrics of this song
 

Songs about parting
1973 songs
1974 singles
1989 singles
1993 singles
Songs written by Kenny Gamble
Songs written by Leon Huff
Cashbox number-one singles
UK Singles Chart number-one singles
Philadelphia International Records singles
Parlophone singles
Polydor Records singles
Billy Bragg songs